Nymphicula atriterminalis is a moth in the family Crambidae. It was described by George Hampson in 1917. It is found on Sulawesi in Indonesia.

References

Nymphicula
Moths described in 1917